Battle Cry: Worship from the Frontlines is an album by Teen Mania Ministries.

Track listing

 "You Are Good"
 "BattleCry"
 "Forevermore/Awesome God"
 "Wrap Me In Your Arms"
 "Rescue"
 "Worthy Is Not Enough"
 "I Am Free"
 "To The Ends Of The Earth"
 "Children And Kings"
 "Filled With Glory"
 "Rain Down"

2005 live albums